Stefan Schauer (born 12 January 1983 in Schongau, West Germany) is a retired German ice hockey defenseman. He was drafted 162nd overall by the Ottawa Senators in the 5th round of the 2001 NHL entry draft.

Career
Schauer played 203 games in the DEL, getting 29 points. He played for Kölner Haie and the Nürnberg Ice Tigers. He also played 127 games in the German second division for EV Duisburg and SC Riessersee, getting 30 points.

International
Schauer represented Germany at the 2003 World Junior Championships, the 2005 World Championships, and at the 2006 Olympic Winter Games.

Career statistics

Regular season and playoffs

International

External links
http://www.hockeydb.com/ihdb/stats/pdisplay.php?pid=53571
http://www.eliteprospects.com/player.php?player=21472
http://sports.espn.go.com/oly/winter06/hockey/news/story?id=2270142

1983 births
Living people
German ice hockey defencemen
Ice hockey players at the 2006 Winter Olympics
Olympic ice hockey players of Germany
Füchse Duisburg players
SC Riessersee players
Ottawa Senators draft picks
People from Weilheim-Schongau
Sportspeople from Upper Bavaria